Hamdani or al-Hamdani, may refer to:

People with the surname

 Harith al-Hamdani, contemporary of Muhammad
 Saeed Ibn Qais Hamdani, Tabi‘un hermit
 Abu Muhammad al-Hasan al-Hamdani (893–945), Arab geographer, historian and astronomer
 Abu Firas al-Hamdani (932–968), Arab prince and poet
 Yusuf Hamdani (1062–1141), Persian Sufi master
Mir Sayyid Ali Hamadani (1314–1384 ), Persian Sufi Muslim Saint 
 Shaikh Ghulam Hamdani (1751–1844), Indian Urdu poet
 Sayyad Laal Shah Hamdani (died 1896), Muslim scholar and Sufi shaykh
 Smail Hamdani (1930–2017), Algerian politician
 Ra'ad al-Hamdani (1945–2015), Iraqi general under Saddam Hussein
 Salah Al-Hamdani (born 1951), Iraqi poet, actor, and playwright
 Talat Hamdani (born 1953), Pakistani American anti-discrimination activist and mother of Mohammad Salman Hamdani
 Fayçal Hamdani (born 1970), Algerian footballer
 Dorsaf Hamdani (born 1975), Tunisian singer and musicologist
 Mohammad Salman Hamdani (1977–2001), Pakistani American scientist and EMT killed in the 9/11 attacks
 Rachid Hamdani (born 1985), Moroccan footballer
 Musalam Fayez Al Hamdani (born 1987), Emarati footballer
 Michael John Hamdani, Pakistani Canadian who perpetrated a terrorism hoax in 2002
Majid Zeki HAMEED Al-Hamdani (born 1950), Iraqi Physics Scientist

Other
 Banu Hamdan (Musnad: 𐩠𐩣𐩵𐩬), a Sabaean clan that dates back to the 1st millennium BCE
 Hamdani, Yemen, a village in Sana'a Governorate
 Hamdani, a strain of Arabian horse

See also
 Hamadani (disambiguation)
 Hamdan, a given name and surname
 Hamdanid dynasty, Syria
 Hamdanids (Yemen)